Abe Zvonkin (March 6, 1910 – August 22, 2002) was a Canadian track and field athlete, an all-star and Grey Cup champion Canadian football player and professional wrestler. He was born in New York City, United States and died in Hamilton, Ontario.

Personal life
Abe Zvonkin was born in New York City, son of Russian immigrants. The family later moved to Canada when Zvonkin was only two years old. He attended the Queen's University in Kingston, Ontario, where he began playing football. Zvonkin was married for 73 years to Jean Zvokin and together they had three children, one daughter and two sons. After retiring from professional wrestling Zvorkin would travel the United States and Canada competing in  dog shows for many years. He died on August 22, 2002, from Cancer.

Athletics
While Zvonkin was born in New York, New York, he represented Canada at the 1930 Empire Games. At the games Zvonkin won the bronze medal in the discus throw event. He finished fourth in the shot put competition, one place out of medal contention.

Canadian Football
Zvonkin began his football career in 1933 with the Hamilton Tigers of the Ontario Rugby Football Union, but when he attended Queen's University he became an all-star in 1934 with the Queen's Golden Gaels. He returned to the Tigers for 3 more seasons in 1937, ending with his enlistment during World War II. He played two more seasons with the Hamilton Flying Wildcats, winning the Grey Cup in 1943, his last season.

Professional wrestling career
After being influenced by Whipper Billy Watson, Zvorkin made his professional wrestling debut on March 24, 1944, defeating Al Dunlop. From the beginning Zvonkin played the heel (wrestling term for those who play the "bad guys"), thriving in the role. Over the years Zvonkin wrestled under a number of different identities or ring names, including masked characters Mr. X and the Purple Phantom. He also worked as "Mr. E" as well as under his real name, playing off his Russian heritage. Zvonkin retired in 1961.

Championships and accomplishments
Stampede Wrestling
Alberta Tag Team Championship (1 time) – with Jim Henry

References

External links
 obsessedwithwrestling.com
 

1910 births
2002 deaths
American people of Russian descent
Canadian people of Russian descent
Canadian male discus throwers
Canadian male shot putters
Canadian male professional wrestlers
Athletes (track and field) at the 1930 British Empire Games
Commonwealth Games bronze medallists for Canada
Commonwealth Games medallists in athletics
Ontario Rugby Football Union players
Queen's Golden Gaels football players
Hamilton Tigers football players
Hamilton Wildcats football players
Professional wrestlers from New York (state)
Professional wrestlers from Hamilton, Ontario
American emigrants to Canada
Stampede Wrestling alumni
Athletes from Hamilton, Ontario
20th-century professional wrestlers
Professional wrestlers from New York City
Medallists at the 1930 British Empire Games